The Sinister Spire is an adventure module for the 3.5 edition of the Dungeons & Dragons fantasy role-playing game.

Plot summary
The Sinister Spire begins where the waters of a sunless sea met a pebble-strewn shore, beyond which opens a wide Underdark vista shimmerling with pale cave-light. Titanic columns as big as castles in a line stretch miles into the misted distance. The player characters must explore the spire-city and face the terrors that lurk within.

Publication history
The Sinister Spire was written by Bruce R. Cordell and Ari Marmell, and was published in June 2007. Cover art was by Steve Prescott, with interior art by Wayne England.

Reception

References

Dungeons & Dragons modules
Role-playing game supplements introduced in 2007